Afaf Zurayk (born 1948) is a Lebanese multimedia artist and poet living and working in Beirut, Lebanon.

Education and teaching 

Born in Beirut, Afaf Zurayk graduated from the American University of Beirut in 1970 with a BA in fine arts with distinction, and obtained an MA in Islamic art from Harvard University in 1972. She taught in Lebanon at the Beirut University College (now Lebanese American University) and the American University of Beirut, as well as in the continuing education programs of the Corcoran College of Art and Design and Georgetown University in Washington D.C.

Artworks Statement 
Through her most recent exhibition statement, Afaf captures her innermost values best, when she writes:

Biography 
Recounting her journey in life in her own words:

Books 
To date, Afaf Zurayk has authored six books:

1. My Father. Reflections, published by Rimal Books in 2010, is an essay in photograph that tells a very personal tale. Yet in its scope, the essay moves beyond the particular to explore an understanding of a very complex relationship of a daughter with her father. The father, Constantin Zureiq, was a historian and a leading force in contemporary Arab thought. The daughter, Afaf, is an artist. Drawing on this most basic and formative relationship, Afaf examines visually, through images of light and shadow, the deep roots of bonding as well as the concept of time as it unfolds for a historian and for an artist.

2. lovesong, published by Rimal Books in 2011, is a portfolio of poems and paintings that unfold rhythmically to echo love as it moves forward and backward in time.

3. Drawn poems, published 2012, a collection of drawings printed and bound in an edition of 500 copies.

4. Return Journeys, a monograph published in 2019, documents Afaf’s creative journeys over the last several decades; journeys that traverse a wide range of media and themes, all united by a shared expression in visualizing what afaf calls , “the resounding sound of silence.” A collection of voices from colleagues, students, and friends who reflect on Afaf’s art, the publication stands testimony to the power of an art that speaks from the depths of the souls. Return Journeys Monograph was produced alongside its eponymous retrospective exhibition, held at Saleh Barakat Gallery in 2019.

5. Drawn By Light, published in 2019 by the American University of Beirut Press, represents a dialogue between image and word, and experience and thought. In this sequence of twenty pairs of images and texts spanning forty years of the artist's personal growth, it offers readers a rare view of the nature of expression. The intuitive choice of couplets and the way they flow reveal singular aspects of the creative process. The book invites readers on a journey aimed at understanding art through the transformative shift that comes from combining experience and thought, looking within while also observing from without.

6. Beyond Art: Printed and bound in Lebanon, Beyond Art brings together poems and paintings that artist Afaf Zurayk created during the COVID pandemic lockdown. The book reveals the deeply introspective nature of quarantining and of discovering one’s self in isolation. Beyond Art is a prayer that invites the reader in a non-linear emotional narrative that captures the sentiments of the moment. In a world that is constantly rearranging itself, friendship and love endure to pave the way for a more hopeful future.

References 

Harvard Graduate School of Arts and Sciences alumni
1948 births
Living people
Artists from Beirut
Lebanese artists
Academic staff of the American University of Beirut
Academic staff of Lebanese American University
American University of Beirut alumni